Events from the year 1957 in Sweden

Incumbents
 Monarch – Gustaf VI Adolf
 Prime Minister – Tage Erlander

Events
13 October – Swedish pensions system referendum

Popular culture

Sport
7 to 15 March – The World Table Tennis Championships were held in Stockholm

Film
1 July – Med glorian på sned released

Births

25 January – Eskil Erlandsson, politician
6 March – Elisabeth Leidinge, football goalkeeper
9 March – Mona Sahlin, politician
28 March – Jessica Zandén, film actress
19 June – Anna Lindh, politician (died 2003)
27 June – Erik Hamrén, football player and manager
5 July – Torsten Jakobsson, alpine skier.
20 August – Mary Stävin, actress
23 August – Örjan Blomquist, cross-country skier (died 2008)
25 August – Christer Björkman, singer
4 October – Anders Flanking, politician
3 November – Dolph Lundgren, Swedish actor and martial artist

Full date unknown
Eva Hellstrand, farmer and a Swedish politician.

Deaths

24 January – Hans Lindman, football player (born 1884).
8 April – Sten Selander, writer and scientist (born 1891).
15 April – Fredrik Rosencrantz, horse rider (born 1879)
13 June – Carl Bonde, military officer and horse rider (born 1872).
30 September – Hjalmar Johansson, diver, swimmer and track and field athlete (born 1874)
18 November – Carl Ström, film actor (born 1880)

References

 
Sweden
Years of the 20th century in Sweden